Alper Kaya was born in 1990 in Ankara. He wrote sports articles for BirGün and SoL. He is currently writing soccer articles on saturdays for Evrensel. In 2010, he was awarded with "Praise Award of Sports Column of the Year" by the Journalists Society of Turkey. Nine of his books were published and also took place in eleven anthologies with his works.

Early life
Kaya was  born in Ankara, in 1990. He lived in Zonguldak and Istanbul. He graduated from the Institute of Media and Communication at the University of Anatolia. He works as a social media consultant for some companies. He was study in University of Istanbul when his first novel 08.00 was published.

Work
Alper Kaya started writing regularly in 2007. His some articles published on local newspapers. After he won a university and moved Istanbul, his articles published on a national newspaper BirGun. Also, one of this articles' won a high prestige prize from Journalists' Union on Turkey. He is the youngest journalist who have this prize.

Kaya's first novel 08.00 published in 2011. This novel has a psychological thriller theme. His second novel Valiz which published on 2014 is a rare novel about Korean War and Extraction of Cyprus in Turkey.

His crime novel series "Komiser Tahsin" (named from the series's detective) had its first novel published in 2014 which name was Kaçak. Series's second novel Yüzüncü Haber was published on 2015 and third one Tanrı Misafiri was published on 2016. His sixth novel Bütün Kuralları Yık! was published 2017.

Also, took place in eleven anthologies with his works.

He is a sport writer on Evrensel and his stories publish many websites on Turkey.

Books
 08:00 / Postiga (2011), 
 Valiz / Ozan (2014), 
 Bütün Kuralları Yık / Oğlak (2017), 
 Uykusuzlar İçin Hayatta Kalma Rehberi / Kent (2018), 
 Kabakulak Yazı / Arsine (2020),

Komiser Tahsin series
 Kaçak: Komiser Tahsin #1 / Kent (2014), 
 Yüzüncü Haber: Komiser Tahsin #2 / Kent (2015), 
 Tanrı Misafiri: Komiser Tahsin #3 / Kent (2016), 
 Fotoğraftaki Kadın / Kent (2018),

Anthologies
 Tuhaf Alışkanlıklar Kitabı
 Öyküden Çıktım Yola
 Aşkın Karanlık Yüzü
 Pati Öyküleri
 Sadık Dostlara
 Kısa Film Öyküleri
 Karanlık Yılbaşı Öyküleri
 Son Gemi - Antoloji 2
 Kanlakarışık
 Aslında Yaşanmadı

Awards

Sports Article of the Year
On 4 March 2011, the Journalists' Union announced that Alper Kaya had been awarded the 2010 Sports Article of the Year.

Kaya held his prize on 28 March 2011 at Sabancı Center, Istanbul. This prize made him a youngest journalist who have awarded from Journalists' Union of Turkey.

References

External links
 The comprehensive website on Alper Kaya
 Goodreads page

1990 births
Living people
Crime fiction writers
Turkish novelists
21st-century novelists
People from Ankara
Istanbul University alumni